William Dick (11 October 1922 – 27 March 2004) was an Australian cricketer. He played 18 first-class cricket matches for Victoria between 1947 and 1957. He was later awarded the Order of Australia for his works in cancer research.

See also
 List of Victoria first-class cricketers

References

External links
 

1922 births
2004 deaths
Australian cricketers
Victoria cricketers
Cricketers from Newcastle, New South Wales